Volodja Semitjov (1912–1985) was a Russian-born screenwriter, journalist and novelist who settled and worked in Sweden.  The son of the writer Vladimir Semitjov, the family emigrated to Sweden in 1923. His younger brother was Eugen Semitjov.

Selected filmography
 When Love Came to the Village (1950)
 One Summer of Happiness (1951)
 Four Times Love (1951)
 The Clang of the Pick (1952)
 Bread of Love (1953)
 Young Summer (1954)
 The Girl in the Rain (1955)
 Seventeen Years Old (1957)
 A Lion in Town (1959)
 Every Day Isn't Sunday (1959)
 The Invisible Terror (1963)
 Sailors (1964)
 The Girl from the Islands (1964)
 Här kommer bärsärkarna (1965)
 Mask of Murder (1985)

References

Bibliography
 Cowie, Peter & Elley, Derek. World Filmography: 1967. Fairleigh Dickinson University Press, 1977.
 Kwiatkowski, Aleksander.  Swedish Film Classics: A Pictorial Survey of 25 Films from 1913 to 1957. Courier Dover Publications, 1983.

External links

1912 births
1985 deaths
Russian emigrants to Sweden
Swedish screenwriters